M139 could refer to:

 M-139 (Michigan highway)
 Mercedes-Benz M139 engine
 the US Army model number for the Hispano-Suiza HS.820 20 mm autocannon
 the Maserati M139 platform, a front mid-engine, rear-wheel-drive automobile platform
 M139 bomblet, a chemical cluster bomb for launch on a ground-to-ground rocket